Inter Dobrich is a Bulgarian football club from Dobrich, formed in 2013, which currently competes in Bulgaria's fourth division, the Dobrich Regional Football Group–East. Inter plays its home matches at the Druzhba Stadium, training ground, in Dobrich.

History

2013–present
The club was established in 2013, initially as a college football team under Varna's International University College (now Varna University of Management). In 2014, the football club appointed head coach Radoslav Boyanov and later that year, Inter Plachidol won the Dobrich Regional Football Group–East. Subsequently, the team proved to be successful in the play-offs against Orlovets 2008 and as a result they were promoted to the North-East V Group.

In 2016 the team was moved to Dobrich. On 10 October 2016 Inter left the Third League after their player Radoslav Georgiev was suspended from playing football for 1 year. All their matches for the 2016-17 season were annulled. In 2017, Veselin Ignatov has returned as head coach. Three years later, the team was promoted to the Third League, but they relegated in the same season. Since then, Inter plays in Dobrich Regional Football Group–East.

Shirt and sponsors
The team’s main colours are blue and black. The team is financially and institutionally supported by Varna University of Management.

Personnel

Club Leadership

Managers history

Past seasons

League positions

References

External links
Official website
bgclubs.eu

Football clubs in Bulgaria
Association football clubs established in 2013
2013 establishments in Bulgaria